Waes may refer to:

 Aert van Waes, a Dutch Golden Age painter
 Edmond Vanwaes, also Van Waes, a Belgian rower
 Pays de Waes (locomotive), a preserved tank locomotive built in 1844
 Sint-Gillis-Waas, French: Saint-Gilles-Waes, a Belgian municipality
 Tom Waes, a Belgian television presenter and actor
 WAES (FM), a former high school radio station